The 2000 Broadland District Council election took place on 4 May 2000 to elect members of Broadland District Council in England. This was on the same day as other local elections.

Election result

References

2000 English local elections
May 2000 events in the United Kingdom
2000
2000s in Norfolk